The Urban Cycling Road Course was one of nine temporary venues used during the 2008 Summer Olympics in Beijing, People's Republic of China. The road cycling race started at the North Square of Yongdingmen in Beijing's Chongwen District and finished at Juyong Pass in Changping District. The route also passed through Xuanwu, Dongcheng, Xicheng, Chaoyang and Haidian districts.

References

Beijing2008.cn profile

Venues of the 2008 Summer Olympics
Defunct sports venues in China
Olympic cycling venues